This is a list of people from Kirklees, a metropolitan district in West Yorkshire, England. This list includes people from Batley, Birstall, Cleckheaton, Denby Dale, Dewsbury, Heckmondwike, Holmfirth, Huddersfield, Kirkburton, Marsden, Meltham, Mirfield and Slaithwaite. The list is arranged alphabetically by surname:



A
 Simon Armitage – poet, novelist and playwright, born in Marsden

B
 James Berry – executioner who hanged 131 people, born in Heckmondwike 
 Tracy Brabin – television writer, television, film & theatre actor, politician; born in Batley and attended Heckmondwike Grammar School.
 Sharon Brogden – (1966–) – voice actor, author and businesswoman, born in Mirfield
 Sir David Brown (1904–1993) – managing director of David Brown Ltd, owner of Aston Martin Ltd, born in Huddersfield
 Jeff Butterfield – international rugby union player; British Lion, 1955; born in Heckmondwike

C 
 Roy Castle - versatile stage and TV entertainer, born in Scholes, Holmfirth
Alan Chesters (1989–2003) – Bishop of Blackburn, born in Huddersfield
Paul Copley (25 November 1944–) – English actor and voice-over artist born in Denby Dale
Albert Craig – known as the "Surrey Poet", wrote poems on cricket and football, born and raised in Meltham.

H
 Edward Ramsden Hall – motor racing driver, born in Milnsbridge
 Roger Hargreaves – author and illustrator of children's books, including Mr Men series, born in Cleckheaton
 Sir Harold Percival Himsworth FRS – medical scientist, worked on diabetes, born in Huddersfield
 Lena Headey
 George Herbert Hirst - cricketer for Yorkshire and England, born in Huddersfield
 Percy Holmes - cricketer for Yorkshire and England, born in Huddersfield

I
 Derek Ibbotson – athlete, set new world record for running a mile in 1957, born in Huddersfield

K
 Gorden Kaye – comedic actor, René in  Allo, Allo, born in Huddersfield

M
 James Mason – film actor, born in Huddersfield

P
 Joseph Priestley – theologian, natural philosopher, discoverer of oxygen, born in Birstall

R
 Wilfred Rhodes - cricketer for Yorkshire and England, born in Huddersfield

S
 Ryan Sidebottom – cricketer for Yorkshire and England, born in Huddersfield
 Patrick Stewart – film, stage and television actor, Captain Jean-Luc Picard in Star Trek: The Next Generation, born in Mirfield
 Frank Sykes – international rugby union player, born in Batley

W

 Jodie Whittaker – film and television actor, born in Skelmanthorpe; attended Scissett Middle School and Shelley High School. 
 Harold Wilson – politician, Labour Prime Minister 1964–1970 and 1974–1976, born in Huddersfield

See also
:List of people from West Yorkshire

References

 
Lists of English people by location
People from Kirklees